Danny Yeo is a Singaporean host, theatre director, writer and lecturer. He has over a decade of experience in hosting TV, as well as being a former radio DJ, and writing books regarding topics such as culture, youth and psychology. He is also a World Vision goodwill ambassador in Singapore. In the year 2010, he was nominated for the "Best Director" award in The Straits Times' theatre awards.

Early life 
Danny Yeo's Chinese-educated parents encouraged him to be interested in Chinese culture and language, which he studied along with the English language, achieving a high level of proficiency in both languages. After he graduated secondary school and junior college, Yeo studied science at the National University of Singapore and decided to pursue a mass communications degree in the United States.

Career and achievements 
From the 1990s to the early 2000s, Yeo hosted the morning drive-time show on YES 933 Mandarin radio station and certain variety shows on Mediacorp Channel 8. Danny Yeo has won the founder of Pure Talents award for his years of rich experience in various fields, Top 20 Most Popular Male Artistes in Star Awards 2000, and the most creative DJ Golden Mic Award in the year 2000. From 2001 to 2004, he crossed over to television with SPH MediaWorks and helped to operate 2 television channels, Mediacorp Channel U and former Channel i, as well as hosting on UFM100.3, a Mandarin radio station. At the end of 2004, both stations decided to merge, which ended Yeo's career in this area. He then taught at institutions such as Ngee Ann Polytechnic and Singapore Management University. In 2004, the Singapore Media Academy twice honoured him at the Ngee Ann Polytechnic academic awards for his excellence in teaching. In 2015, he returned to TV on Channel U as host of the popular talk show Face Off! and a lifestyle documentary show about child labour; Innocence Lost (2016) and Innocence Lost II (2017).

Awards and nominations

References 

Living people
Singaporean television personalities
Singaporean male film actors
Singaporean male stage actors
Singaporean DJs
Singaporean people of Chinese descent
Anglo-Chinese School alumni
National University of Singapore alumni
Year of birth missing (living people)